The Dasht-e Bayaz and Ferdows earthquakes occurred in Dashte Bayaz, Kakhk and Ferdows, Iran in late August and early September 1968. The mainshock measured 7.4 on the moment magnitude scale and had a maximum perceived intensity of X (Extreme) on the Mercalli intensity scale. Damage was heavy in the affected areas with thousands of lives lost in the first event and many hundreds more in the second strong event.

Tectonic setting 

The Iranian plateau is confined by the Turan platform in the north and the Zagros fold and thrust belt and Makran Trench in the south.

In eastern Iran, the shortening is accommodate by a combination of relatively short northwest–southeast trending reverse faults, long north–south trending right lateral strike-slip faults and shorter west–east trending left-lateral strike-slip faults.

Earthquakes 

The first earthquake occurred on August 31, 1968, measuring 7.1 on the moment magnitude scale. The focal mechanism indicated strike-slip faulting and the observed 80 km surface rupture showed that this earthquake resulted from movement on the western part of the west–east trending left-lateral Dasht-e-Bayaz Fault. The greatest observed left-lateral coseismic offset was about 4.5 m, with 2 m being the average observed offset. The western end of the Dasht-e-Bayaz Fault ruptured and produced another large earthquake in 1979.

Damage
The mainshock destroyed five villages in the Dasht-e Bayaz area, and at least half of the buildings in another six villages from Kakhk to Sarayan. A strong aftershock on September 1, measuring 6.4 on the moment magnitude scale, destroyed Ferdows. More than 175 villages were destroyed or damaged in this earthquake.

See also 
List of earthquakes in 1968
List of earthquakes in Iran

References

Further reading

External links
 Earthquakes with 1,000 or More Deaths since 1900 – United States Geological Survey
 

1968 Dasht-e Bayaz and Ferdows
Dasht-e Bayaz And Ferdows Earthquake, 1968
Earthquake
History of Razavi Khorasan Province
History of South Khorasan Province
Earthquake clusters, swarms, and sequences